Joana Manta (born 26 July 1977) is a former professional tennis player from Switzerland.

Tennis career
Manta began competing on the ITF circuit in 1991 while still a junior, later partnering with Ludmila Richterová to win the girls' doubles title at the 1993 Australian Open. 

At the age of 15 she debuted for the Switzerland Fed Cup team in 1993, featuring in the doubles rubbers of a World Group tie against the United States and a play-off against Peru. 

In 1995 she played in another three Fed Cup ties, with both of her two wins coming in doubles, teaming up with former junior partner Martina Hingis.

ITF finals

Singles finals (0-1)

Doubles finals (0-1)

Personal life

Both his father Leonardo and his brother Lorenzo also played tennis professionally.

References

External links
 
 
 

1977 births
Living people
Swiss female tennis players
Australian Open (tennis) junior champions
Grand Slam (tennis) champions in girls' doubles